Chifa is Chinese Peruvian culinary tradition based on Cantonese elements fused with traditional Peruvian ingredients and traditions. The term is also used to describe restaurants that serve the chifa cuisine. 

Though originating in Peru, the chifa tradition has spread to neighboring countries like Ecuador, Chile, and Bolivia through increased Chinese immigration. 

Chinese-Peruvian food has become one of the most popular types of food in Peru. The first Chinese-Peruvian fusion restaurants were opened in Lima in around 1920 in Lima's Chinatown (Barrio Chino). There are thousands of chifa restaurants across all districts of Lima and many more throughout other cities of Peru, with sometimes multiple independent restaurants operating in close proximity on a single city block.

Etymology
The majority of Chinese Peruvians have origins in southern China, where Cantonese is spoken. The Comisión Lexicografía de la Academia Peruana (CLAP) proposed that the word chifa is from Cantonese 食飯喇 (Jyutping: sik9 fan6 la3), meaning "to eat cooked rice" ("comer arroz cocido"). The term came to prominence in Lima in the 1930s, when Limeños heard Chinese people using the expression "chifan" as a call to eat in the restaurants they ran. 

A similar loanword, chaufa (a chifa fried rice dish), comes from the Cantonese 炒飯 or chaofan (Jyutping: caau3 faan6), meaning "fried rice".

History

In the late 19th and early 20th centuries, Chinese immigrants came to Peru as coolies. They came mainly from the southern Chinese province of Guangdong, particularly the capital city of Guangzhou. For the most part, they settled on the coast of Peru and in the capital city of Lima. 

As Chinese Peruvians progressed economically, they imported a limited number of ingredients to produce a more authentic version of their home cuisine. Additionally, they began to plant a variety of Chinese vegetables with seeds imported from China. However, due to a lack of ingredients, they were not able to prepare their cuisine in the authentic manner of their homeland.

Around 1920, the first Chinese Peruvian restaurants were opened in Lima, and they were given the name chifa. Limeños were amazed by the bittersweet sauce, chaufa rice, soup, and other dishes. Wealthy Limeños became fascinated by chifa, to an extent that in some regions of the country there are more chifas than criollo restaurants.

Peruvian chefs began to use products used in traditional Chinese cooking such as ginger, soy sauce, scallions, and a variety of other ingredients which began to make their way into daily Limeña cuisine.

There are different accounts on the development of chifa restaurants in Lima, such as the following:

"Why is the Chinatown of Lima near the central market called Capon? Because on Ucayali Street pigs, bulls, sheep and goats were fattened to be made more appetizing. Near Capon Street there was a piece of land known as Otaiza, which was rented by a group of Chinese free of the [indenturement] contract, doing what they best knew how to do: cooking and merchanting (...) Capon turned into the birthplace of Chinese food and of the first Peruvian chifas, a blessing from the sky. Soon all of Lima comes to eat at Ton Kin Sen, to Thon Po, to Men Yut, and to San Joy Lao where there was dancing to a live orchestra. Chinese restaurants became known as Chifa. For some this word was derived from the Chinese ni chi fan or "Have you eaten yet". Soon later would come the dish chau fan (fried rice), and finally, chaufa, a dish that comes with almost every chifa meal."
- León, R., 2007 pp.134-136.

The history of chifa is deeply rooted in the development of the Chinatown of Lima, which has become focal point in cultural, artistic, commercial, and especially gastronomic interest. Chinatown is located near Capon Street in Barrios Altos, in the Historic Centre of Lima.

Cuisine

Peruvian chifa is distinct, due to its Peruvian cuisine influences. Like most Chinese food internationally and within China, rice, meat, noodles and vegetables are important staples to chifa. Chifa is enjoyed by all socioeconomic levels, evidenced by chifas directed toward those with more disposable income, while chifas de barrio are directed towards a different social stratum. Currently, in the city of Lima there are over 6,000 chifa restaurants.

Chifa dishes

Chifa in other countries
Since at least the 1970s, Chinese immigrants had also opened chifa restaurants in neighboring Ecuador. Chifas have also been opened in Bolivia, Chile and Spain.

See also
Chinese cuisine
Peruvian cuisine
Chinese Peruvians
Chinatown of Lima
Chinese Latin American cuisine

Notes

References

References
Zapata Acha, Sergio (noviembre de 2006). Diccionario de gastronomía peruana tradicional (1 edición). Lima, Perú: Universidad San Martín de Porres. .

External links

Cantonese cuisine
Peruvian cuisine
Restaurants by type
Chinese fusion cuisine